Rivne Universal Avia was an airline based in Rivne, Ukraine. It operated a fleet of regional aircraft from Rivne for UPS. Its main base was Rivne Airport.

Fleet 
In August 2006, the Rivne Universal Avia fleet included:

 1 Let L-410 T
 12 Let L-410 UVP

References

Defunct airlines of Ukraine